Clube Recreativo Desportivo do Libolo, usually known simply as Recreativo do Libolo, is an Angolan multisport club based in Libolo, Cuanza Sul Province.

History has it that C.R.D. Libolo resulted as a merger of three different clubs in the village of Calulo: Palmeiras FC, Cambuco FC and Fortaleza FC.

At present, the club competes in two sports: football  and basketball.

Honours
Angolan League: 4 
2011, 2012, 2014, 2015

Angola Cup: 1
2016
Runner-up: (1) 2008

Angola SuperCup: 2 
2015, 2016
Runner-up: (3) 2012, 2013, 2017

Recent seasons
C.R.D. Libolo's season-by-season performance since 2011:

League and cup positions

Performance in CAF competitions

CAF Champions League: 4 appearances
2016 – First Round
2013 – Group Stage
2012 – First Round
2010 – Preliminary Round

CAF Confederation Cup: 2 appearances
2017 – Group Stage (Top 16)
2009 – Second Round

Stadium
Recreativo do Libolo is one of the few clubs in the Angolan football league to own a stadium. The 10,000-seat Estádio Municipal de Calulo (Calulo Municipal Stadium) has recently been renamed after and to honour Africa's great statesman and nationalist Patrice Lumumba.

Players and staff

Players

Staff

Manager history

See also
Libolo Basketball
Girabola
Gira Angola

External links
  
 Girabola.com profile
 Zerozero.pt profile
 Facebook profile
 Soccerway profile
 Town of Calulo - Libolo (portuguese)

References

Recreativo Libolo
Association football clubs established in 1942
1942 establishments in Angola
Recreativo Libolo